Paul of Antioch was a Melkite Christian monk, bishop and author who lived between the 11th and 13th centuries. His best known works are defences of Christianity written for Muslims and a treatise urging the conversion of Muslims and Jews.

Life
Almost all that is known of Paul is derived from his own surviving writings. He was a native of Antioch who became a monk and later served as the bishop of Sidon. Even the century in which he lived is uncertain. He made use of the writings of Elias of Nisibis, who died in 1046, and the earliest known manuscript of his work dates to 1232.

In his Letter to a Muslim Friend, Paul claims to have travelled to "the homelands of the Romans [i.e., the Byzantines], Constantinople, the country of Amalfi, some Frankish provinces, and Rome." There he met and discussed the Qurʾān with "eminent and learned men". Doubt has been cast on the accuracy of these claims. Many commentators view them as a literary device, a fiction that allows Paul to distance himself from the objections to Islam expressed by his European interlocutors. On the basis that these were actual journeys,  argues for placing Paul's activity in the period 1140–1180, because it was a period of relative calm after the establishment of the Crusader states and before the rise of Saladin. Herman Teule, on the other hand, places Paul's activity earlier, around 1100. David Thomas and Sidney Griffith suggest a late date, around 1200, as more likely, on the grounds that his polemical writings are unlikely to have gone unnoticed for long.

Works
Paul wrote in Arabic. There are 24 works in manuscript that are ascribed to him, but only five or six of these as generally accepted as authentic. Five were edited and translated into French in a critical edition published by Paul Khoury in 1964. Several other treatises of disputed authenticity were published in 1906 with German translations. In 2013, Russian translations appeared in print. His Letter to a Muslim Friend has been translated into English.

Paul's six known works are:
Letter to a Muslim Friend 
Concise Intellectual Treatise
Treatise to the Gentiles and the Jews
Treatise on the Christian Sects
Treatise on the Oneness and the Union
Responses to a Muslim Sheikh

The Letter to a Muslim Friend relays the arguments which Paul had heard from various European intellectuals regarding the Qurʾān and Muḥammad.
The Concise Intellectual Treatise is a short general treatment of reason.
The Treatise on the Christian Sects covers contemporary sects.
The Treatise to the Gentiles (or Nations) and the Jews is an apologetic and evangelistic treatise that seeks to show why everybody should convert to Christianity.
The Treatise on the Oneness and the Union is a discussion of the Trinity and the hypostatic union.
The Responses to a Muslim Sheikh is a letter intending to refute moral relativism and theological determinism and defend the miracles of Jesus.

Notes

Bibliography

People from Antioch
People from Sidon
Eastern Orthodox monks
Bishops of the Greek Orthodox Church of Antioch
Medieval Arabic-language writers
Medieval letter writers
Medieval theologians
Philosophers of the medieval Islamic world